Lee Hoo-Kwon (born 30 October 1990) is a South Korean footballer who plays as midfielder for Jeonnam Dragons.

Career
He was selected by Bucheon FC in the 2013 K League draft.

References

External links 

1990 births
Living people
Association football midfielders
South Korean footballers
Bucheon FC 1995 players
Gimcheon Sangmu FC players
Seongnam FC players
Pohang Steelers players
Jeonnam Dragons players
K League 2 players
K League 1 players
Place of birth missing (living people)
People from Pohang
Sportspeople from North Gyeongsang Province